Dixie Blundell,  D.D.(1725–1808) was an 18th-century Anglican priest in Ireland.

He was born in Dublin and educated at Trinity College, Dublin. Blundell was Rector of St Paul's Dublin. Blundell was appointed Precentor of Bishop of Kilmacduagh in 1771; a prebendary of Clonfert in 1771; and a prebendary of Christ Church Cathedral, Dublin in 1775. He was Dean of Kildare from 1782 until his death.

References

1808 deaths
Alumni of Trinity College Dublin
18th-century Irish Anglican priests
19th-century Irish Anglican priests
1727 births
Deans of Kildare
Christian clergy from Dublin (city)